Bieber Bench is a relatively horizontal upland area of  at the south side of the Surveyors Range, Churchill Mountains. It was named by the Advisory Committee on Antarctic Names after John W. Bieber of the Bartol Research Institute, University of Delaware: he was United States Antarctic Program principal investigator for solar and heliospheric studies with Antarctic cosmic ray observations at McMurdo Station and South Pole Station, 1988–2002.

References
 

Plateaus of Antarctica
Landforms of the Ross Dependency
Shackleton Coast